
Year 723 (DCCXXIII) was a common year starting on Friday (link will display the full calendar) of the Julian calendar. The denomination 723 for this year has been used since the early medieval period, when the Anno Domini calendar era became the prevalent method in Europe for naming years.

Events 
 By place 
 Asia 
 Gunakamadeva, Lichhavi ruler (rajah), founds the city of Kathmandu (modern Nepal). During his reign, he transforms the agrarian society to an industrial city trading between India and Tibet. 

 By topic  
 Religion 
 Boniface, Anglo-Saxon missionary, fells Thor's Oak (a sacred tree) near Fritzlar in Hesse, marking the decisive event in the Christianization of the northern Germanic tribes (approximate date).
 Boniface makes Büraburg, a fortified Frankish settlement, his temporary religious base.

Births 
 Arbeo, bishop of Freising (approximate date)
 Isonokami no Yakatsugu, Japanese nobleman (d. 781)

Deaths 
 October 3  – Elias I of Antioch, Syriac Orthodox Patriarch of Antioch.
 Adalbert, duke of Alsace
 Fachtna mac Folachtan, Irish abbot
 Ō no Yasumaro, Japanese nobleman

References